The Deep River Camelback Truss Bridge is a steel camelback truss resting on stone and concrete piers, with a macadam road surface covering a plank deck.
It spans the Deep River in North Carolina, United States between the hamlets of Gulf in Chatham County and Cumnock in Lee County in a quiet rural setting amid woods and farmlands on both sides of the river.   It was originally constructed in 1901. The bridge is listed on the National Register of Historic Places.  The bridge is open to pedestrian traffic only.  Vehicles may use a replacement bridge located about a hundred yards east of the historic structure.

Location
The bridge is located within Deep River Park, which also includes picnic facilities and a boat ramp. It is a popular spot for geocaching.   To reach from US-421 at the Deep River, go southeast and take a left onto Cumnock Road. Follow the road to the county line. As you cross the river on the new bridge, look to your left for a view of the truss bridge. Continue 0.1 mile north to an intersection with Everett Dowdy Road, and the park entrance, on your left.

History

The Deep River Camelback Truss Bridge, identified as Truss Bridge #155
by the North Carolina Department of Transportation, spans the Deep River
on SR 2153 north of the community of Cumnock in northern Lee County,
providing access between Cumnock and the Gulf community in southern
Chatham County. This section along the Deep River was the site of coal,
iron, and copper mining operations and iron foundries through much of
the nineteenth century. The present bridge was originally erected in 1901 as part of a multi-
span bridge over the Cape Fear River at Lillington, about thirty miles to the
southeast in Neal's Creek Township, Harnett County. After a span of the
bridge collapsed in December 1930, the remaining spans were disassembled in
order for a new bridge to be constructed at the site in 1931, and in 1932 one
of the salvaged spans was re-erected at the present site over the Deep River to
replace a wooden covered bridge that had burned about 1929.
Bridges have served this location at least as early as 1833. A
nineteenth-century fieldstone pier supports the present bridge on the
north end may date to an earlier bridge at the site, called
Evans Bridge after Peter Evans, whose plantation, Egypt, lay on the
south bank of the river.

In 1979 the bridge was one of
thirty-five bridges (including eight camelback trusses) formally
determined eligible for the National Register as
important examples of metal truss engineering technology in the state
from 1880 to 1935, and for associations with transportation improvements 
in the state in the early twentieth century.
Today Truss Bridge #155 is one of only four camelback trusses surviving
in North Carolina.
In 1992 the Department of Transportation completed a new concrete bridge
spanning the Deep River east of Truss Bridge #155. Ownership of the
older bridge was transferred to the Deep River Park Association,
and it will be preserved in place as part of the group's Rails-Trails
route under development.

Design
Truss Bridge #155 is a camelback truss bridge, 160 feet long and divided
into eight panels, with the two trusses joined by a system of portal,
lateral, and sway braces.  The truss system is
pin-joined. The trusses have die-punched eyes on the bottom chords but
also forge-welded double clevises on all tie bars.   The bridge is supported by coarse stone (north side) and concrete piers, with a macadam covered plank road surface.  The remains of the
earthen base and timber support for the central pier of an earlier
bridge may be seen below the bridge.

References

External links
 http://bridgehunter.com/nc/chatham/deep-river/
 https://archive.today/20130205143151/http://visitpittsboro.com/see/gulf/deep-river-camelback-truss-bridge

Former road bridges in North Carolina
Pedestrian bridges in North Carolina
Buildings and structures in Chatham County, North Carolina
Steel bridges in the United States
Road bridges on the National Register of Historic Places in North Carolina
National Register of Historic Places in Chatham County, North Carolina
Historic Civil Engineering Landmarks
Historic American Engineering Record in North Carolina
Transportation in Chatham County, North Carolina
Tourist attractions in Chatham County, North Carolina
Parker truss bridges in the United States